"These Walls" is a song by American rapper Kendrick Lamar. It was released on October 13, 2015, as the fifth and final single from his third album, To Pimp a Butterfly (2015). The track was written by Kendrick Lamar, Terrace Martin, Larrance Dopson, James Fauntleroy and Rose McKinney. It won Best Rap/Sung Performance at the 58th Annual Grammy Awards on 15 February 2016. Lamar has stated that this song is his favourite from the album.

Lyrical interpretation
Rolling Stone stated the song "teases the dark underbelly of sudden fame and offers a peek at the rapper's life when he hit his lowest points", while Billboard editor Kris Ex wrote that Lamar is "pondering sex and existence in equal measure; it's a yoni metaphor about the power of peace, with sugar walls being escape and real walls being obstacles."

Music video

The song's music video premiered on October 28, 2015, on Lamar's Vevo account. It was directed by Colin Tilley and The Little Homies. Entitled "Behind the Walls: A Black Comedy", the clip opens in a jail cell with Corey Holcomb and then flashes back to a wild night at an apartment complex – from strippers, to drugs, altercations, and skits. Lamar first appears in his room grinding with a girl while her girlfriends catch it all on camera. He then crashes the stage at a talent show and performs "Hit the Quan" alongside Terry Crews. Meanwhile, Isaiah Rashad gets tied up and seduced in his bedroom, and SZA finds Lamar crashing through her apartment wall. By the end of the night, the cops come calling and Holcomb's character gets arrested. The video ends with "To be continued". For Rap-Up, "the Compton rapper shows his comedic side (and dance moves) in the cinematic clip."

Live performances
On May 27, 2015, Lamar performed the song live on The Ellen DeGeneres Show, complete with a white-clad couple who danced around the stage as a nearby artist painted a portrait of them. "These Walls" was featured on the Kunta's Groove Sessions tour.

Charts

Certifications

References

External links

2015 songs
2015 singles
Bilal (American singer) songs
Kendrick Lamar songs
Songs about prison
Songs written by Kendrick Lamar
Songs written by James Fauntleroy
Songs written by Terrace Martin
Music videos directed by Colin Tilley
Grammy Award for Best Rap/Sung Collaboration
Songs written by Larrance Dopson